Charles Hillman Brough (July 9, 1876 – December 26, 1935) was an American politician who served as the 25th Governor of Arkansas from 1917 to 1921. He signed a bill for women’s suffrage in Arkansas and supported it nationally.

Biography
Charles Brough was born in Clinton in Hinds County in central Mississippi. In 1894, he graduated from Mississippi College in  Clinton.  He earned his Ph.D. in 1898 from Johns Hopkins University in Baltimore, Maryland. He graduated from the University of Mississippi Law School in 1902. He taught at Mississippi College and the former women's institution,  Hillman College, also in Clinton, Mississippi, and then the University of Arkansas at Fayetteville. He was a deacon in the Baptist Church.

Brough was elected governor in 1916. He defeated attorney Wallace Townsend, an Iowa native who later served as the long-term Republican national committeeman from Arkansas. Townsend made another unsuccessful gubernatorial bid in 1920 against Brough's successor, Thomas Chipman McRae.

During the Brough administration, the state reformatory for women was founded and a girl's industrial school was opened. He signed into law a bill which allowed women to vote in primary elections. Under Brough, Arkansas became the only southern state to allow women's suffrage prior to the Nineteenth Amendment. Brough, a liberal Democrat, publicly supported anti-lynching laws. He was reelected as governor in 1918, when the Republican Party endorsed Brough against the Socialist Clay Fulks.

In 1919, the Elaine massacre in Elaine, Phillips County, took place in which white residents created false conspiracies about black residents wanting to kill whites although black residents were only trying to form a union to demand better wages as sharecroppers. Brough requested federal troops from the War Department and accompanied the troops to the scene. There, soldiers rounded up black residents and, as the Mississippi vigilantes and local posse were already doing, killed black residents indiscriminately. At least two and possibly more victims were killed by soldiers. Up to 237 black people were killed in the massacre. That was one of the deadliest racial conflicts in all of American history.

Brough was a personal friend of the Woodward family and was an early influence on prominent southern historian C. Vann Woodward.

Brough served as the director of the Public Information Bureau from 1925 to 1928 and in 1929 as president of Central Baptist College in Conway, Arkansas. He chaired the Virginia-District of Columbia Boundary Commission from 1934 to 1935. Brough was also a Civitan. Brough also unsuccessfully ran for the U.S. Senate in 1932 but lost in the Democratic primary to Senator Hattie Caraway.

Brough died in Washington, D.C. Like many other Arkansas governors, he is interred at the Roselawn Memorial Park Cemetery in the capital city of Little Rock.

Asked how to pronounce his surname, he told The Literary Digest: "Pronounced as if it were spelled bruff." (Charles Earle Funk, What's the Name, Please?, Funk & Wagnalls, 1936.)

See also

 Moore v. Dempsey

References

Further reading
 Cortner, Richard, A Mob Intent On Death,

External links
 Encyclopedia of Arkansas History & Culture entry: Charles Hillman Brough

Democratic Party governors of Arkansas
American white supremacists
University of Mississippi School of Law alumni
Johns Hopkins University alumni
Mississippi College alumni
University of Arkansas faculty
Heads of universities and colleges in the United States
1876 births
1935 deaths
People from Clinton, Mississippi
Politicians from Fayetteville, Arkansas
Politicians from Little Rock, Arkansas
Baptists from Mississippi
Baptists from Arkansas